Ramsdean is a village in the East Hampshire district of Hampshire, England. It is 2.7 miles (4.3 km) west of Petersfield.

The nearest railway station is Petersfield, 2.7 miles (4.3 km) east of the village.

Actor Jude Law currently resides in Ramsdean with his children attending the nearby Bedales School in Petersfield.

Villages in Hampshire